Robey Warshaw LLP is a boutique investment bank based in London. The firm was founded in 2013 and is led by investment bankers Sir Simon Robey, Philip Apostolides, and Simon Warshaw.

History
Robey, Apostolides and Warshaw were prominent dealmakers in the City of London prior to setting up the firm. Robey is the former co-head of mergers and acquisitions at Morgan Stanley, Warshaw is the former co-head of investment banking at UBS, while Apostolides was a managing director in Morgan Stanley's financial sponsors group. In 2020, former Chancellor of the Exchequer George Osborne joined the firm as the first new Partner since its founding.

According to The Observer, banking experts have attributed Robey Warshaw's early success to the connections of its founders and its ability to remain discreet during negotiations owing to its small size, at fewer than 20 employees. The Telegraph highlighted the firm's "personal approach" favoured by corporate executives.

Notable activities

 In 2014, Robey Warshaw helped AstraZeneca successfully fend off a politically charged merger bid by Pfizer.
 In 2015, it served as adviser to BG Group and SABMiller in their mergers with Royal Dutch Shell and Anheuser-Busch InBev respectively.
 In 2018, it advised Comcast on their takeover bid for Sky UK.
 In 2021, it advised the London Stock Exchange Group on its acquisition of data provider Refinitiv. In the same year, it advised National Grid plc on its purchase of Western Power Distribution.
 In 2022, it advised a consortium led by former Guggenheim Partners, President Todd Boehly on its bid for Chelsea F.C. In the same year it also advised HSBC on its defense against a proposed spin-off of its Asian unit by its shareholder, Ping An Insurance.
 In 2023, it advised HSBC on their rescue of Silicon Valley Bank's UK arm, with Simon Robey and George Osborne at the helm.

References

External links

Investment banks
British companies established in 2013
Companies based in the City of Westminster